Wellington "Welly" Yang (Traditional Chinese: 楊呈偉, Pinyin: Yáng Chéngwěi, born February 13, 1973) is a Taiwanese-American actor, singer, writer and producer.

Biography
Yang was born in New York City, the son of Tzu-Shong Yang and Maysing Huang Yang. His parents emigrated from Taiwan in 1969. His father was a resident physician in UW Health University Hospital in 1967, and afterward President of "North American Taiwanese Medical Association in New York" in 1986. His mother returned to Taipei in 1991 to direct foreign affairs for the Democratic Progressive Party.

Yang grew up in Great Neck, New York and graduated from the Lawrenceville School in New Jersey in 1990.  He then attended Columbia University, graduating in 1994 with honors in political science/international relations.

Early Work (Actor, singer, producer, writer) 

In 1993, while a senior at Columbia, Yang was picked to star in the original Broadway production of Miss Saigon, where he went on to play the lead role of Thuy.  He left the Miss Saigon company in 1995 to tour Asia in the title role of Aladdin in Cole Porter's Aladdin. That same year, Yang was cast by the American opera director Peter Sellars' to play one of the leading roles in John Adams (composer) world premiere of I Was Looking At the Ceiling and then I Saw the Sky.  The opera's world tour included stops at Lincoln Center, Cal Arts in Berkeley, the Edinburgh International Festival, Hamburg's Thalia Theater, the Helsinki Festival, and the Paris Festival.  These performances were called "dynamic" by Time Magazine, "passionate" by The New York Times, and "one of the most remarkable moments in recent operatic times" by the Scotland Times.  Yang returned to the New York stage in 1998 as Whizzer in NAATCO's non-traditional casting of William Finn's Falsettoland.  The production was lauded for its universal appeal and The New York Times added that "it's Mr. Yang as the cocky, athletic Whizzer who delivers the most smashing performance. He's persuasive from start to finish as the boy toy who becomes a man in the arms of Marvin and the hospital bed he's confined to after developing AIDS. His angry anthem You Gotta Die Sometime is equal parts fire and frustration and further confirmation that Mr. Finn's ethnically specific work can in fact be a moving, multicultural experience."<ref>Marks, Peter. "THEATER REVIEW; It's Family That Matters, No Matter What Family." 'The New York Times. July 17, 1998. p. 2.</ref>

Yang has also appeared in numerous television shows such as Law & Order: Special Victims Unit, As the World Turns, National Geographic Explorer and Ghostwriter.  In 2001, Yang also co-hosted the talk show Studio Y on MSG Metro Channels, where he interviewed celebrities that included Tina Fey, Ed McMahon, Leslie Bibb, and many others.

In 2005, Yang premiered the musical concert Finding Home, a show that paralleled the story of his parents to that of him and his then girlfriend Dina Morishita.  The show premiered at UCLA's Royce Hall and was presented by TUF.  It was at the end of that sold-out concert that Yang surprised Morishita by proposing to her in front of the sold-out audience.Archived at Ghostarchive and the Wayback Machine:  Finding Home later went on to play at Taiwan's National Concert Hall and Vancouver's Explorasian Festival in 2006.

In 1997, Yang founded Second Generation, a New York-based theater company dedicated to bringing Asian American stories to the world's stage.  Under his artistic leadership, the company cultivated the works of many emerging playwrights, many of whom went on to receive productions throughout the country.  The company also commissioned Yang along with co-writers Brian Yorkey and Woody Pak to write and develop the musicals Making Tracks and The Wedding Banquet (a musical adaptation of Ang Lee's Academy Award-winning film).  Making Tracks first premiered in 1999 at the Taipei Theater in New York  then went on to further development at Taiwan's National Theater in 2001, Seattle's Village Theater, in 2002, and San Jose Repertory Theater in 2004.  The Wedding Banquet received its world premiere with productions in Singapore, Taiwan, and Seattle. in 2003.  In this production of The Wedding Banquet, Yang and his team chose Dina Morishita (who had formerly played Eponine in Les Misérables and Kim in Miss Saigon) to play opposite Yang as Wei Wei.

In his work with Second Generation, Yang founded the "Concert of Excellence" to celebrate the achievements of Asian Americans in entertainment.   Now presented as the Asian Excellence Awards, the awards show is the only nationally televised event celebrating significant Asian and Asian American achievements in entertainment, the arts and other disciplines that have had a profound impact on American culture. 

He married Dina Lynne Morishita, a Japanese-American stage actress, in July 2005. The couple has two children, Wyatt and Dakota.

Plays and musicals
 Miss Saigon Cole Porter's Aladdin I Was Looking At the Ceiling and Then I Saw the Sky Making Tracks The Wedding Banquet Finding HomeFilmography
 Law & Order: Special Victims Unit Ghostwriter The Cut Runs Deep Studio Y Popcorn Shrimp Asian Excellence Awards''

See also

Peter Sellars
Taiwanese American
John Adams

Notes

External links
Website
Asian Excellence Awards
Second Generation
The Meaning of Asian American - Newsweek

1973 births
Living people
American male actors of Taiwanese descent
American people of Taiwanese descent
American male television actors
Male actors from New York City
People from Great Neck, New York
Columbia College (New York) alumni
Lawrenceville School alumni